Bigger Than Us is a 2021 French documentary film produced and directed by Flore Vasseur, co-produced by Marion Cotillard, and written by Vasseur and Melati Wijsen. The film made its world premiere at the 2021 Cannes Film Festival in the special section Cinema for the Climate on 10 July 2021. It was released theatrically in France by Jour2fête on 22 September 2021. It was nominated for the César Award for Best Documentary Film in 2022.

Plot
The documentary follows Melati Wijsen, an 18-year-old Indonesian girl and well-established activist against plastic pollution in her country. She wants to understand how to hold on and continue her action, so she goes on to meet six other young activists across the globe.

Cast
 Melati Wijsen
 Xiuhtezcatl Martinez
 Memory Banda
 René Silva
 Mohamad Al Jounde
 Mary Finn
 Winnie Tushabe

Release
The film made its world premiere at the 74th Cannes Film Festival in the special section Cinema for the Climate on 10 July 2021. It was released theatrically in France by Jour2fête on 22 September 2021.

Reception

Critical response
AlloCiné, a French cinema website, gave the film an average rating of 3.3/5, based on a survey of 12 French reviews.

Home media
The film was released on DVD in France on 1 February 2022. The extras include an interview with director Flore Vasseur, a debate with Mary Finn and Mohamad Al Jounde, a podcast and the webseries "It starts with you".

Awards and nominations

References

External links
 
 
 
 

2021 films
2021 documentary films
2021 independent films
French documentary films
French independent films
Documentary films about environmental issues
Documentary films about refugees
Documentary films about forests and trees
Films shot in Colorado
Films shot in Greece
Films shot in Malawi
Films shot in Uganda
Films shot in Lebanon
Films shot in Rio de Janeiro (city)
2020s English-language films
English-language French films
2020s French films